Lattin-Crandall Octagon Barn is a historic octagonal barn located near Catharine in Schuyler County, New York. It was built in 1893 and is significant as an early example in New York State of the octagon prototype popularized by Elliot Stewart in the 1870s.  It is a frame structure with cupola that features a self-supporting roof without intervening members.

It was listed on the National Register of Historic Places in 1984.

References

Barns on the National Register of Historic Places in New York (state)
Octagon barns in the United States
Infrastructure completed in 1893
Buildings and structures in Schuyler County, New York
National Register of Historic Places in Schuyler County, New York